Xaa-methyl-His dipeptidase (anserinase, aminoacyl-methylhistidine dipeptidase, acetylhistidine deacetylase, N-acetylhistidine deacetylase, alpha-N-acetyl-L-histidine aminohydrolase) is an enzyme. This enzyme catalyses the following chemical reaction

 Hydrolysis of anserine (beta-alanyl!Npi-methyl-L-histidine), carnosine, homocarnosine, glycyl!leucine and other dipeptides with broad specificity

References

External links 
 

EC 3.4.13